Yevgeni Anatolyevich Ageyev (born 25 September 1976) is a Russian retired professional footballer.

He made his professional debut in the Russian Second Division in 1992 for PFC CSKA-d Moscow.

References

1976 births
People from Pavlodar
Living people
Russian footballers
Russia youth international footballers
Russia under-21 international footballers
Association football defenders
FC Rostov players
PFC CSKA Moscow players
FC Moscow players
FC Zhemchuzhina Sochi players
FC Lokomotiv Nizhny Novgorod players
FC Arsenal Tula players
Russian Premier League players
FC Spartak Nizhny Novgorod players
FC Dynamo Kirov players